Bolshevik is an urban locality (an urban-type settlement) in Susumansky District of Magadan Oblast, Russia. Population:

Geography
Bolshevik is located in the Upper Kolyma Highlands near the Byoryolyokh river.

References

Urban-type settlements in Magadan Oblast